Porticus Aemilia  was a portico in ancient Rome. It was one of the largest commercial structures of its time and functioned as a storehouse and distribution center for goods entering the city via the Tiber river.

History and description

The portico was built in 193 BC by aediles Marcus Aemilius Lepidus and Lucius Aemilius Paullus from which the name of the structure and association to the gens Aemilia is derived (Livy, 35.10.12). It was subsequently rebuilt in 174 BC by censors Quintus Fulvius Flaccus and Aulus Postumius Albinus (Livy, 41.27.8).

The development of the Porticus coincided with the rapid growth of the city after the Second Punic War. This increase, in both trade and population, placed stresses on the limited space available in the Forum Boarium and underlined the importance of the river link to Rome's main port at Ostia. The Porticus and the Emporium appear to have worked together to facilitate the unloading, storage, and possibly redistribution of goods and foodstuffs, including imported grain for the corn dole, and appear to have been in continuous operation until the 6th century CE.

They were roofed by a series of overlapping vaults that rose in line with the slope of the hill, offering protection from the elements while allowing in light and air.

By the Trajanic period this space was filled with additional commercial structures, and the large utilitarian spaces in the Porticus were put to a variety of uses, often modified or subdivided to suit the needs of their users.

See also
List of ancient monuments in Rome

Notes

Bibliography
 Filippo Coarelli, Guida archeologica di Roma, Verona, Arnoldo Mondadori Editore, 1984.
 Lucos Cozza and Pier Luigi Tucci, Navalia, in Archeologia Classica 57 (2006), pp. 175–202.
 Giovanna Maria Forni, Extra Portam Trigeminam, in Atlante Tematico di Topografia Antica 22 (2012) pp. 35–40.
 Pierre Gros and Mario Torelli, Storia dell'urbanistica. Il mondo romano, Rome-Bari, Laterza, 2007.
 Giovanni Battista Piranesi, Le antichità Romane, T. 4, tav. Tav. XLVIII
 Pier Luigi Tucci, La controversa storia della Porticus Aemilia, in Archeologia Classica 63 (2012), pp. 575–591.

External links
 Ricerche in corso sui magazzini romani - Study meeting of 13–15 April 2011, Rome, National Roman Museum (in Italian only).
 Scavi in corso dal 2011 per una indagine archeologica - From the website of the Italian Society for the Protection of Cultural Heritage (in Italian only

Ancient Roman buildings and structures in Rome
Colonnades
Rome R. XX Testaccio